Duke of Albany is a peerage title that has occasionally been bestowed on younger sons in the Scottish and later the British royal family, particularly in the Houses of Stuart and Hanover.

History
The Dukedom of Albany was first granted in 1398 by King Robert III of Scotland on his brother, Robert Stewart, the title being in the Peerage of Scotland. "Albany" was a broad territorial term representing the parts of Scotland north of the River Forth, roughly the former Kingdom of the Picts. The title (along with the Dukedom of Rothesay) was the first Dukedom created in Scotland. It passed to Robert's son Murdoch Stewart, and was forfeited in 1425 due to the attainder of Murdoch.

The title was again created in 1458 for Alexander Stewart but was forfeit in 1483. His son John Stewart was restored to the second creation in 1515 but died without heirs in 1536. In 1541 Robert, second son of James V of Scotland, was styled Duke of Albany, but he died at less than a month old. The fourth creation, along with the Earldom of Ross and Lordship of Ardmannoch, was for Mary, Queen of Scots' king consort Lord Darnley, whose son, later James VI of Scotland, I of England and Ireland, inherited the titles on his death. That creation merged with the Scottish crown upon James's ascension. The title, along with the title of Duke of York, with which it has since been traditionally coupled, was created for a fifth time in 1604 for Charles, son of James VI and I. Upon Charles's ascent to the throne in 1625, the title of Duke of Albany merged once again in the crowns.

The title was next granted in 1660 to Charles I's son, James, by Charles II. When James succeeded his elder brother to the throne in 1685, the titles again merged into the crown. The cities of New York and Albany, New York, were thus both named after James, as he was the Duke of York and of Albany.  The pretender, Charles Edward Stuart, gave the title Duchess of Albany to his illegitimate daughter Charlotte; she died in 1789.

The title "Duke of York and Albany" was granted three times by the Hanoverian kings.

The title of "Albany" alone was granted for the fifth time, this time in the Peerage of the United Kingdom, in 1881 to Prince Leopold, the fourth son of Queen Victoria. Prince Leopold's son, Prince Charles Edward (who had succeeded as reigning Duke of Saxe-Coburg and Gotha in 1900), was deprived of the peerage in 1919 for bearing arms against the United Kingdom in World War I. His grandson, Ernst Leopold (1935–1996), only son of Charles Edward's eldest son Johann Leopold, Hereditary Prince of Saxe-Coburg and Gotha (1906–1972), sometimes used the title "Duke of Albany", although the Titles Deprivation Act 1917 stipulates that any successor of a suspended peer shall be restored to the peerage only by direction of the sovereign, the successor's petition for restoration having been submitted for and obtained a satisfactory review of the appropriate Privy Council committee.

Dukes of Albany

First creation, 1398
Other titles (1st Duke): Earl of Fife (1371), Earl of Buchan (1374–1406), Earl of Atholl (1403–1406)
Robert Stewart, 1st Duke of Albany (–1420), third son of Robert II
Other titles (2nd Duke): Earl of Menteith (bef 1189), Earl of Fife (1371), Earl of Buchan (1374)
Murdoch Stewart, 2nd Duke of Albany (1362–1425), eldest son of the 1st Duke was attainted and his honours forfeit in 1425

Second creation, 1458
Other titles (1st Duke): Earl of March (1455), Earl of Mar and Earl of Garioch (1482)
Alexander Stewart, 1st Duke of Albany (–1485), second son of James II, forfeited his honours in 1479, was restored in 1482, then forfeited them again in 1483
Other titles (2nd Duke): Earl of March (1455)
John Stewart, 2nd Duke of Albany (1482–1536), only legitimate son of the 1st Duke, was restored to his father's dukedom and Earldom of March in 1515. The honours became extinct upon his death without issue

Only styled, 1541

| Robert StewartHouse of Stuart1541–1541
| no portrait
| 12 April 1541Falkland Palace, Falklandson of King James V and Queen Mary
| not married
| 20 April 1541Falkland Palace, Falklandaged 8 days
|-
|}

Third creation, 1565

|-
| Henry StuartHouse of Stuart1565–1567also: Earl of Ross and Lord Ardmannoch (1565)
| 
| 19 November 1545Dunfermline Palace, Dunfermlineson of Matthew Stewart and Lady Margaret Douglas
| Mary, Queen of Scots29 July 15651 child
| 10 February 1567Kirk o' Field, Edinburghaged 21
|-
| James StuartHouse of Stuart1567also: Earl of Ross and Lord Ardmannoch (1565);Duke of Rothesay (1398)
| 
| 19 June 1566Edinburgh Castle, Edinburghson of Mary, Queen of Scots and Henry Stuart, Duke of Albany
| Princess Anne of Denmark23 November 15899 children
| 27 March 1625De Vere Theobalds Estate, Cheshuntaged 58
|-
| colspan=5|Prince James succeeded as James VI in 1567 upon his mother's abdication, and his titles merged with the crown.
|-
|}

Fourth creation, 1604

|-
| Charles StuartHouse of Stuart1600–1625also: Marquess of Ormond, Earl of Ross, Lord Ardmannoch (1600–1625);Duke of York (1605–1625);Prince of Wales (1616), Duke of Cornwall (1337) and Duke of Rothesay (1398)
| 
| 19 November 1600Dunfermline Palace, Dunfermlineson of King James I and Queen Anne
| Henrietta Maria of France13 June 16259 children
| 30 January 1649Whitehall Palace, Londonaged 48
|-
| colspan=5|Prince Charles succeeded as Charles I in 1625 upon his father's death, and his titles merged with the crown.
|-
|}

Fifth creation, 1660

| James StuartHouse of Stuart1633 or 1644 – 1685also: Duke of York (1633/1644), Earl of Ulster (1659)
| 
| 14 October 1633St. James's Palace, Londonson of King Charles I and Queen Henrietta Maria
| Anne Hyde3 September 16608 childrenMary of Modena21 November 16737 children
| 16 September 1701Château de Saint-Germain-en-Laye, Parisaged 67
|-
| colspan=5|Prince James succeeded as James II in 1685 upon his brother's death, and his titles merged with the crown.
|-
|}

Sixth creation, 1881

| Prince LeopoldHouse of Saxe-Coburg and Gotha1882–1884also: Earl of Clarence and Baron Arklow (1881)
| 
| 7 April 1853Buckingham Palace, Londonson of Queen Victoria and Prince Albert
| Princess Helena of Waldeck and Pyrmont27 April 18822 children
| 28 March 1884Villa Nevada, Cannesaged 30
|-
| Prince Charles EdwardHouse of Saxe-Coburg and Gotha1884–1919also: Earl of Clarence and Baron Arklow (1881)
| 
| 19 July 1884Claremont, Esherson of Prince Leopold and Princess Helena
| Princess Victoria Adelaide of Schleswig-Holstein11 October 19055 children
| 6 March 1954Coburgaged 69
|-
|colspan=5|The Titles Deprivation Act 1917 suspended the title on 28 March 1919.
|-
|}

Family tree

Dukes of Albany in fiction
 Thomas Norton and Thomas Sackville's play Gorboduc includes Fergus, the Duke of Albany, who tries to claim the British throne after Gorboduc's death through his royal descent.
William Shakespeare's King Lear, set in no particular century, includes as a major character the Duke of Albany, who is husband to Lear's daughter Goneril.
In the 2001 film Kate & Leopold, Hugh Jackman plays "Leopold Mountbatten, Duke of Albany," who holds the title in 1876, making him a fictional analog of Prince Leopold, Duke of Albany, who held the title at that time. However, the surname Mountbatten is an anachronism, as the equivalent family at the time would have been called Battenberg.

See also
Duchess of Albany
Duke of York
Duke of York and Albany
Alba
Albany (disambiguation)

References

 
Extinct dukedoms in the Peerage of Scotland
1398 establishments in Scotland
1425 disestablishments in Scotland
1458 establishments in Scotland
1479 disestablishments in Scotland
1482 establishments in Scotland
1483 disestablishments in Scotland
1541 establishments in Scotland
1541 disestablishments in Scotland
1565 establishments in Scotland
1567 disestablishments in Scotland
1604 establishments in Scotland
1625 disestablishments in Scotland
1660 establishments in Scotland
1685 disestablishments in Scotland
1881 establishments in the United Kingdom
1919 disestablishments in the United Kingdom
British and Irish peerages which merged in the Crown
Noble titles created in 1398
Noble titles created in 1458
Noble titles created in 1565
Noble titles created in 1604
Noble titles created in 1660
Noble titles created in 1881